Marc Alexa is a professor of computer science at TU Berlin working in the fields of computer graphics, geometric modeling and geometry processing.

Life
Alexa studied computer science at TU Darmstadt, receiving a Diplom in 1997 and a PhD in 2002. After his graduation, he spent time as a postdoctoral researcher with Greg Turk at Georgia Tech, returning the same year to become assistant professor at TU Darmstadt. In 2005, he became an associate professor for computer graphics at TU Berlin, transitioning to the full professorship in 2010. He conducted research at Caltech, Carnegie Mellon University, Disney Research, ETH Zurich, and the University of Toronto. From 2018 to 2021, he was the editor-in-chief of ACM Transactions on Graphics.

Awards
Alexa received numerous best paper awards at conferences, in particular the Symposium on Geometry Processing. Other noteworthy distinctions:
2022: ERC Advanced Grant
2018: Fellow of the Eurographics Association
2014: Eurographics Outstanding Technical Contributions Award
2012: Engineering Sciences Prize of the Academy, Berlin-Brandenburg Academy of Sciences and Humanities
2010: ERC Starting Grant
2003: Heinz Maier-Leibnitz-Preis of the German Research Foundation

References

External links
 
 

Living people
1974 births
Academic staff of the Technical University of Berlin
Technische Universität Darmstadt alumni
German computer scientists
Computer graphics researchers
European Research Council grantees